The 18th Avenue station is an express station on the IND Culver Line of the New York City Subway, located at the intersection of 18th Avenue and McDonald Avenue in Borough Park, Brooklyn. It is served by the F train at all times and the <F> train during rush hours in the peak direction.

History 
This station opened at 3:00 a.m. on March 16, 1919, as part of the opening of the first section of the BMT Culver Line. The initial section began at the Ninth Avenue station and ended at the Kings Highway station. The line was operated as a branch of the Fifth Avenue Elevated line, with a free transfer at Ninth Avenue to the West End Line into the Fourth Avenue Subway. The opening of the line resulted in reduced travel times between Manhattan and Kings Highway. Construction on the line began in 1915, and cost a total of $3.3 million. Trains from this station began using the Fourth Avenue Subway to the Nassau Street Loop in Lower Manhattan when that line opened on May 30, 1931. The Fifth Avenue Elevated was closed on May 31, 1940, and elevated service ceased stopping here. On October 30, 1954, the connection between the IND South Brooklyn Line at Church Avenue and the BMT Culver Line at Ditmas Avenue opened. With the connection completed, all service at the stations on the former BMT Culver Line south of Ditmas Avenue, including this one, were from then on served by IND trains.

From June 1968 to 1987, express service on the elevated portion of the line from Church Avenue to Kings Highway operated in the peak direction (to Manhattan AM; to Brooklyn PM), with some F trains running local and some running express. During this time period, this station was used as an express station. Express service ended in 1987, largely due to budget constraints and complaints from passengers at local stations. Express service on the elevated Culver Line was ended due to necessary structural work, but never restored.

From June 7, 2016, to May 1, 2017, the southbound platform at this station was closed for renovations, with southbound trains stopping on the center track using the Manhattan-bound platform. The Manhattan-bound platform was closed for a longer period of time, from May 22, 2017 until July 30, 2018, and Manhattan-bound trains stopped on the center track using the Coney Island-bound platform.

Station layout 

This elevated station has two island platforms and three tracks, with the center track not normally used. Except for small sections at either ends, both platforms have brown canopies with green frames and support columns for the entire length. The un-canopied areas have black station sign structures.

The 2018 artwork here is called We are each others by Julien Gardair. It features steel figural sculptures on the platforms that are integrated with seating elements, inspired by historical figures and present residents of the area.

Exits
This station has two entrances/exits, both of which are elevated station houses beneath the tracks. The full-time exit is at the north end. A single staircase from each platform goes down to a waiting area that allows a free transfer between directions and contains public restrooms. Outside of the turnstile bank, there is a token booth and two street stairs going down to either southern corners of 18th and McDonald Avenues.

The station's other entrance/exit at the south end also has a staircase from each platform, waiting area, and two street stairs going down to either side of McDonald Avenue between Lawrence and Parkville Avenues. However, the station house is unstaffed, containing just High Entry/Exit Turnstiles.

Track layout 
North of the station there is a double crossover between the southbound local track and the center express track. Also north of this station, there is a switch from the center express track to the northbound local track. There was formerly a switch to the south, and the girder that formerly supported such a switch indicates that it was a track diverging from the northbound local track to the middle track.

In popular culture
This station is featured in Kevin Smith's film Cop Out as well as in Allen Coulter's film Remember Me, both released in 2010.. A chase scene from Joker (2019), starring Joaquin Phoenix, was also filmed here.

References

External links 

 
 Station Reporter — F Train
 The Subway Nut — 18th Avenue Pictures 
 18th Avenue entrance from Google Maps Street View
 Lawrence Avenue entrance from Google Maps Street View
 Platforms from Google Maps Street View (Under Construction)

IND Culver Line stations
BMT Culver Line stations
New York City Subway stations in Brooklyn
Railway stations in the United States opened in 1919
Borough Park, Brooklyn